Whatever may refer to:

Music

Albums 
 Whatever (Adore Delano album), 2017
 Whatever (Aimee Mann album), 1993
 Whatever (Danny Thompson album), 1987
 Whatever (The Friends of Distinction album), 1970
 Whatever (Green Velvet album), 2001
 Whatever (Hot Chelle Rae album) or the title song, 2011
 Whatever (Jennifer Batten album) or the title song, 2007
 Whatever..., a comedy album by Guido Hatzis, 2000
 Whatever: The '90s Pop & Culture Box, a Rhino Records box set, 2005
 Whatever, by Megumi Hayashibara, 1992
 Whatever, an EP by bbno$, 2018

Songs 
 "Whatever" (Ayumi Hamasaki song), 1999
 "Whatever" (Cro song), 2013
 "Whatever" (En Vogue song), 1997
 "Whatever" (Godsmack song), 1998
 "Whatever" (Ideal song), 2000
 "Whatever" (Jill Scott song), 2005
 "Whatever" (Oasis song), 1994
 "Whatever" (The Statler Brothers song), 1982
 "Whatever", by 4minute from Name Is 4Minute, 2013
 "Whatever", by DJ Khaled from Grateful, 2017
 "Whatever", by Gnarls Barkley from The Odd Couple, 2008
 "Whatever", by Hüsker Dü from Zen Arcade, 1984
 "Whatever", by Imogen Heap from I Megaphone, 1998
 "Whatever", by Lil Tecca from We Love You Tecca 2, 2021
 "Whatever", by Our Lady Peace recorded for Gravity, 2002
 "Whatever", by Pitchshifter from PSI, 2002
 "Whatever", by Róisín Murphy from Take Her Up to Monto, 2016
 "Whatever", by Zoé from Rocanlover, 2003

Other uses 
 Whatever (slang)
 Whatever (novel) (Extension du domaine de la lutte), a 1994 novel by Michel Houellebecq
 Whatever (1999 film), a French adaptation of the novel, directed by directed by Philippe Harel
 Whatever (1998 film), an American teen drama by Susan Skoog
 Whatever with Alexis and Jennifer, a 2005–2010 American radio talk show
 Whatever, a blog by John Scalzi

See also
 
 
 
 Basta (disambiguation)
 -ever, a suffix